On April 3, 1996, a United States Air Force Boeing CT-43A (Flight IFO-21) crashed on approach to Dubrovnik, Croatia, while on an official trade mission. The aircraft, a Boeing 737-200 originally built as T-43A navigational trainer and later converted into a CT-43A executive transport aircraft, was carrying United States Secretary of Commerce Ron Brown and 34 other people. While attempting an instrument approach to Dubrovnik Airport, the airplane crashed into a mountainside. An Air Force technical sergeant, Shelly Kelly, survived the initial impact, but died en route to a hospital. Everyone else on board died at the scene of the crash.

The aircraft was operated by the 76th Airlift Squadron of the 86th Airlift Wing, based at Ramstein Air Base in Germany. Unlike civilian 737s, the military CT-43A version was  equipped with neither a flight data recorder nor a cockpit voice recorder.

Investigation

The official US Air Force accident investigation board report noted several reasons that led the Boeing CT-43A, callsign "IFO-21" (short for Implementation Force), to crash. Chief among the findings was a "failure of command, aircrew error and an improperly designed instrument approach procedure".

The Boeing CT-43A used for this flight was formerly a T-43A navigator training aircraft that was converted for distinguished visitor travel. The flight was on an instrument flight rules non-directional beacon (NDB) approach, which is a non-precision type of instrument approach, to Runway 12 when it strayed off course. Non-precision approaches are those that do not incorporate vertical guidance. While NDB approaches are essentially obsolete in the United States, they are still used widely in other parts of the world. Because of their infrequent use in the United States, many American pilots are not fully proficient in performing them (a NASA survey showed that 60% of American transport-rated pilots had not flown an NDB approach in the last year). The investigation board determined that the approach used was not approved for Department of Defense aircraft, and should not have been used by the aircraft crew. The board determined that the particular NDB approach used required two operating ADFs, the instrument used to fly such an approach, on board the aircraft, but this aircraft only had one ADF installed. To successfully fly the approach, one ADF was required to track the outbound course of 119° from the Koločep NDB (KLP), while another ADF was required to observe when the aircraft had flown beyond the Cavtat NDB (CV), which marked the missed approach point. Further, the board noted that the approach was rushed.

Five other aircraft had landed prior to the CT-43A and had not experienced any problems with the navigational aids. No emergency call from the pilots occurred, and they did not initiate a missed approach, though they were beyond the missed approach point when they hit the hill at 2:57 pm local time.

It was a requirement of the US Air Force to review and approve all charts, and to ban flights into airports for which the charts did not meet the proper American aviation standards. The commander of the 86th Operations Group, Col. John E. Mazurowski, revealed that he had requested (but not yet received) approval to waive the review for Dubrovnik, as the approach had worked for years, and the delay of a full review could hamper the interests of the American diplomatic mission.

Victims
Thirty-five people, six military crewmembers and twenty-nine civilians, died in the crash. Thirty-three of the victims were Americans and two were Croatians. Twelve Department of Commerce officials, including Secretary Brown, were among the deceased.

Flight crew
The crew consisted of pilot Captain Ashley "AJ" Davis, aged 35, employed by U.S. Air Force since 1989, who had qualified to fly the Boeing CT-43 in 1992 and accumulated 2,942 flight hours in his career with 582 hours on the Boeing CT-43; and co-pilot Captain Timothy Shafer, aged 33, employed by U.S. Air Force since 1988, with 2,835 flight hours of which 1,676 hours were on the Boeing CT-43.

Outcomes
Dubrovnik Airport was singled out for an improperly designed approach and landing procedure.

A number of US Air Force (USAF) officers were found to have contributed to a failure of command.  The general commanding the 86th Airlift Wing, Brig. Gen. William E. Stevens, vice-commander Col. Roger W. Hansen, and the commander of the 86th Operations Group, Col. John E. Mazurowski, were all relieved of their posts.
 Mazurowski was later found guilty of a dereliction of duties and was demoted to major, while 12 other officers were reprimanded.

The USAF ordered all military aircraft to be equipped with a flight data recorder and a cockpit voice recorder.

American military aircraft are no longer allowed to fly into airports without explicit approval from the United States Department of Defense, not even for high-ranking diplomatic missions.

Legacy
The area of the crash site is identified by a large stainless steel cross on Stražišće peak. Hikers can reach the peak via the "Ronald Brown Path", which is named in commemoration of the U.S. Secretary of Commerce who died in the crash.

A memorial room has been installed in the Ronald Brown memorial house in the old city of Dubrovnik. It features portraits of the crash victims as well as a guest book.

The head of navigation at Čilipi Airport, Niko Jerkuić, was found dead three days after the accident with a bullet wound to his chest. The police investigation concluded that the case was a suicide.

In popular culture
The crash of IFO-21 was covered in "Fog of War", an episode from the fourth season (2007) of the internationally syndicated Canadian TV documentary series Mayday.

References

Further reading

External links

 USAF accident report 
 

Aviation accidents and incidents involving controlled flight into terrain
Aviation accidents and incidents in 1996
Aviation accidents and incidents in Croatia
Accidents and incidents involving United States Air Force aircraft
Accidents and incidents involving the Boeing 737 Original
April 1996 events in Europe
Croatia–United States military relations
1996 disasters in Croatia